STS-77 was the 77th Space Shuttle mission and the 11th mission of the Space Shuttle Endeavour. The mission began from launch pad 39B from Kennedy Space Center, Florida on 19 May 1996 lasting 10 days and 40 minutes and completing 161 revolutions before landing on runway 33.

Crew

Mission highlights

NASA's flight of shuttle Endeavour was devoted to opening the commercial space frontier. During the flight the crew performed microgravity research aboard the commercially owned and operated SPACEHAB module. The mission also deployed and retrieved the Spartan-207/IAE (Inflatable Antenna Experiment) satellite and rendezvoused with a test satellite. A suite of four technology experiments known as the Technology Experiments for Advancing Missions in Space (TEAMS) also flew in the Shuttle's payload bay.

One of these, the Commercial Float Zone Facility (CFZF) was developed through international collaboration between the U.S., Canada, and Germany. It heated various samples of electronic and semiconductor material through the float-zone technique. Another facility on SPACEHAB was the Space Experiment Facility (SEF) which grew crystals by vapor diffusion.

The Goddard Space Flight Center's (GSFC) Spartan-207 satellite was used to deploy and test the Inflatable Antenna Experiment (IAE) which laid the groundwork for future technology development in inflatable space structures. It tested the performance of a large inflatable antenna during a ninety-minute mission. The antenna structure was then jettisoned and the SPARTAN-207 spacecraft recovered at mission end.

Inside Endeavour's cargo bay the four TEAMS experiments operated throughout the mission. They included the Global Positioning System (GPS) Attitude and Navigation Experiment (GANE) to determine to what accuracy the GPS system can supply attitude information to a space vehicle; the Vented Tank Resupply Experiment (VTRE) to test improved methods for in-space refueling; the Liquid Metal Thermal Experiment (LMTE) to evaluate the performance of liquid metal heat pipes in microgravity conditions, and the Passive Aerodynamically Stabilized Magnetically Damped Satellite (PAMS) payload to demonstrate the technology of the principle of aerodynamic stabilization in the upper atmosphere. Cameras on the shuttle recorded the PAMS satellite as it was deployed and tracked its movements.

Secondary experiments on the flight included the Brilliant Eyes Ten Kelvin Sorption Cryocooler Experiment (BETSCE), the Aquatic Research Facility (ARF) and the Biological Research In a Canister (BRIC) experiment.

Also onboard was the Plant-Generic Bioprocessing Apparatus (P-GBA) designed by BioServe Space Technologies. Several plant species were flown in this double middeck locker configurated plant growth chamber. Investigations on plant growth in micro-gravity as well as research on the feasibility of agriculture in space were successfully carried out.

A Coca-Cola fountain dispenser (officially a Fluids Generic Bioprocessing Apparatus-2 or FGBA-2) was developed for use on STS-77 as a test bed to determine if carbonated beverages can be produced from separately stored carbon dioxide, water and flavored syrups and determine if the resulting fluids can be made available for consumption without bubble nucleation and resulting foam formation. The unit held  each of Coca-Cola and Diet Coke. The original FGBA flew on STS-63.

Mission insignia
The two red portions of the NASA logo on the left of the insignia symbolize the flight's numerical designation in the Space Transportation System's mission sequence.

See also

 List of human spaceflights
 List of human spaceflights to Mir
 List of Space Shuttle missions
 Outline of space science

References

External links

 NASA mission summary 
 STS-77 Video Highlights 
 STS-77 Press Kit

STS-077
Spacecraft launched in 1996